Ralf Hübner (born May 3, 1939, Berlin) is a German jazz percussionist.

Hübner attended the Hochschule für Musik in Berlin (1958–1962), studying both double bass and drums there and playing with Benny Bailey and Nathan Davis. Upon graduating he joined the Jazzensemble des Hessischen Rundfunks, an ensemble he would work up to 2010. He also began a decade-long association with Albert Mangelsdorff. In the 1970s he worked with musicians and ensembles such as the Joki Freund, Volker Kriegel, Itaru Oki, Michel Pilz, Manfred Schoof, and Eberhard Weber. In the 1980s and 1990s he worked with Christof Lauer among others.

References
Barry Kernfeld, "Ralf Hübner". The New Grove Dictionary of Jazz, 2nd edn.

1939 births
Living people
German jazz drummers
Male drummers
Musicians from Berlin
German male jazz musicians